The 2018 Central Coast Pro Tennis Open was a professional tennis tournament played on outdoor hard courts. It was the second edition of the tournament and was part of the 2018 ITF Women's Circuit. It took place in Templeton, United States, on 24–30 September 2018.

Singles main draw entrants

Seeds 

 1 Rankings as of 17 September 2018.

Other entrants 
The following players received a wildcard into the singles main draw:
  Danielle Lao
  Ann Li
  Taylor Townsend
  Sophia Whittle

The following players received entry into the singles main draw using a protected ranking:
  Nadia Podoroska

The following players received entry from the qualifying draw:
  Robin Anderson
  Maegan Manasse
  Giuliana Olmos
  Amra Sadiković

Champions

Singles

 Asia Muhammad def.  Sesil Karatantcheva, 2–6, 6–4, 6–3

Doubles

 Asia Muhammad /  Maria Sanchez def.  Quinn Gleason /  Luisa Stefani, 6–7(4–7), 6–2, [10–8]

External links 
 2018 Central Coast Pro Tennis Open at ITFtennis.com
 Official website

2018 ITF Women's Circuit
2018 in American tennis
Tennis tournaments in California